Tūhourangi is a Māori iwi of New Zealand with a rohe centered on Lake Tarawera, Lake Rotomahana, Lake Okaro, Lake Okareka, Lake Rotokākahi, Lake Tikitapu and Lake Rotorua.

They have 3 marae, Te Pakira Marae in Whakarewarewa, Hinemihi (Te Papatere-a-Rātorua) Marae in Ngāpuna and Tūhourangi Marae in Waitangi.

Te Arawa FM is the radio station of Te Arawa iwi, including Tūhourangi, Ngāti Pikiao and Ngāti Whakaue. It was established in the early 1980s and became a charitable entity in November 1990. The station underwent a major transformation in 1993, becoming Whanau FM. One of the station's frequencies was taken over by Mai FM in 1998; the other became Pumanawa FM before later reverting to Te Arawa FM.

See also
List of Māori iwi

References